Neglected diseases may refer to:
 Neglected tropical diseases
 Rare diseases and orphan diseases